Genocide denial is the attempt to deny or minimize the scale and severity of an instance of genocide. Denial is an integral part of genocide and includes secret planning of genocide, propaganda while the genocide is going on, and destruction of evidence of mass killings. According to genocide researcher Gregory Stanton, denial "is among the surest indicators of further genocidal massacres".

Some scholars define denial as the final stage of a genocidal process. Richard G. Hovannisian states, "Complete annihilation of a people requires the banishment of recollection and suffocation of remembrance. Falsification, deception and half-truths reduce what was, to what might have been or perhaps what was not at all."

Examples include Holocaust denial, Armenian genocide denial, and Bosnian genocide denial. The distinction between respectable academic historians and those of illegitimate historical negationists, including genocide deniers, rests on the techniques used to write such histories. Illegitimate revisionists rewrite history to support an agenda, often political, using falsification and rhetorical fallacies to obtain their results.

Analysis
According to Taner Akçam, "the practice of "denialism" in regard to mass atrocities is usually thought of as a simple denial of the facts, but this is not true. Rather, it is in that nebulous territory between facts and truth where such denialism germinates."

David Tolbert, president of the International Center for Transitional Justice, states:

By individuals and non-government organisations
 In his 1984 book The Other Side: The Secret Relationship Between Nazism and Zionism Palestinian President Mahmoud Abbas argued that only "a few hundred thousand" Jews were murdered in the Holocaust, that the Jews brought this on by their behaviour, and that Zionists had collaborated with the Nazis to send more Jews to Israel. In a 2006 interview, without retracting these specifics, he stated: "The Holocaust was a terrible, unforgivable crime against the Jewish nation, a crime against humanity that cannot be accepted by humankind."
 In February 2006 David Irving was imprisoned in Austria for Holocaust denial; he served 13 months in prison before being released on probation.
 David Campbell has written of the now defunct British magazine Living Marxism that "LM's intentions are clear from the way they have sought to publicise accounts of contemporary atrocities which suggest they were certainly not genocidal (as in the case of Rwanda), and perhaps did not even occur (as in the case of the murder of nearly 8,000 at Srebrenica)." Chris McGreal writing in The Guardian on 20 March 2000 stated that Fiona Fox writing under a pseudonym had contributed an article to Living Marxism which was part of a campaign by Living Marxism that denied that the event which occurred in Rwanda was a genocide.
 Scott Jaschik has stated that Justin McCarthy, is one of two scholars "most active on promoting the view that no Armenian genocide took place". He was one of four scholars who participated in a controversial debate hosted by PBS about the genocide.
 Darko Trifunovic is the author of the Report about Case Srebrenica, which was commissioned by the government of the Republika Srpska. The International Criminal Tribunal for the former Yugoslavia (ICTY) reviewed the report and concluded that it "represented one of the worst examples of revisionism, in relation to the mass executions of Bosniaks committed in Srebrenica in July 1995". After the report was published on 3 September 2002, it provoked outrage and condemnation by a wide variety of Balkans and international figures, individuals, and organizations.
Patrick Karuretwa stated in the Harvard Law Record that in 2007 the Canadian politician Robin Philpot "attracted intense media attention for repeatedly denying the 1994 genocide of the Tutsis"
On 21 April 2016 a full-page ad appeared in The Wall Street Journal and Chicago Tribune that directed readers to Fact Check Armenia, a genocide denial website sponsored by the Turkish lobby in the US. When confronted about the ad a Wall Street Journal spokesperson stated, "We accept a wide range of advertisements, including those with provocative viewpoints. While we review ad copy for issues of taste, the varied and divergent views expressed belong to the advertisers."

By governments

Pakistan 
The government of Pakistan continues to deny that the 1971 Bangladesh genocide took place under Pakistan's rule of Bangladesh (East Pakistan) during the Bangladesh Liberation War of 1971. They typically accuse Pakistani reporters (such as Anthony Mascarenhas), who reported on the genocide, of being "enemy agents". According to Donald W. Beachler, professor of political science at Ithaca College:

Similarly, in the wake of the 2013 Shahbag protests against war criminals who were complicit in the genocide, English journalist Philip Hensher wrote:

Serbia 

According to Sonja Biserko, president of the Helsinki Committee for Human Rights in Serbia, and Edina Becirevic, the faculty of criminology and security studies of the University of Sarajevo:

Turkey 

The government of the Republic of Turkey has long denied that the Armenian genocide was a genocide. According to Akçam, "Turkish denialism [of the genocide] is perhaps the most successful example of how the well-organised, deliberate, and systematic spreading of falsehoods can play an important role in the field of public debate" and that "fact-based truths have been discredited and relegated to the status of mere opinion".

United States 
According to the China Ministry of Foreign Affairs: 

Others such as Glenn T. Morris and Emily Prey have observed that the United States has not acknowledged its genocide of Native Americans.

Law

The European Commission proposed a European Union–wide anti-racism law in 2001, which included an offence of genocide denial, but European Union states failed to agree on the balance between prohibiting racism and freedom of expression. After six years of debating, a watered down compromise was reached in 2007 which gave EU states freedom to implement the legislation as they saw fit.

Effects 

Genocide denial has an immense impact on both victim and perpetrator groups. The denial not only affects the relations and the possible reconciliation between victim and perpetrator, but it also affects the identity of the respective group, impacting at large the society they live in. While confrontation of the committed atrocities can be a tough process in which the victim feels humiliated anew by reliving the past, it still has a benign therapeutic effect, helping the society to come to terms with the past. From a therapeutic point of view, letting the victim confront the past atrocity and its related painful memories is one way to reach a closure and to understand that the harm has occurred in the past. By acknowledging the past errors, the relating memories are co-processed, "sometimes resulting in the narrator feeling a little better and the listener a little worse." This also helps the memories to enter the shared narrative of the society, thereby becoming a common ground on which the society can build its future on. Denying recognition will have a negative effect, further victimising the victim which will feel not only wronged by the perpetrator but also by being denied recognition of the occurred wrongdoing. This implies that denial also has a pivotal role in shaping the norms of a society since the omission of any committed errors, and thereby the lack of condemnation and punishment of the committed wrongs, risks normalising similar actions, rising the society's tolerance for future occurrences of similar errors. Scholars exemplify the latter aspect in the case of Republic of Turkey and how the Turkish state's Armenian genocide denial has had far-reaching effects on the Turkish society throughout its history in regard to both ethnic minorities, especially the Kurds, but political opposition in general. The denial also affects the self-image of the perpetrator by omitting the "righteous" individuals among its own ranks. This lack of differentiation between "we" (the righteous") and "them" (the wrongful "other") could result in a rather homogeneous perception of the nation in question, thus making the victim (but also third parties) to project the perpetrating role onto the entire society/nation, aggravating the prospects of future reconciliation.

Bhargava notes that "[m]ost calls to forget to disguise the attempt to prevent victims from publicly remembering in the fear that 'there is a dragon living on the patio and we better not provoke it.'" In Bhargava's words "It is well known that remembrance of past harm reinforces asymmetries of power. The fear of physical suffering in the future feeds on the remembrance of past acts of repression. Such thinking encourages passivity and obedience in victims, and this in turn serves the interest of the powerful. But such remembrance can cut both ways. If memory of suffering is kept alive, reprisal may occur at future, inopportune moments." In the Armenian case, one could point to the committed terrorist acts during 1970's and 1980's (e.g. ASALA and JCAG as a direct result of the Turkish state denial of the genocide).

However, political contingencies could in certain cases necessitate some degree of denial (or at least holding back the entire truth) to promote a recovery and re-building a society. This approach is especially conspicuous in post-conflict societies where the prevailing power constellation might require a political trade-off in regard to past committed wrongs. This aspect was true in post-Apartheid South Africa where the perpetrating group was still in possession of power (judicial, police, army), risking political instability if they were put on trial and risked punishment. This was, among others, one of the main reasons for granting amnesty in exchange for confessing to committed errors during the transitional period in South Africa. However, the society at large and the victims in particular will perceive this kind of trade-offs as "morally suspect," and sooner or later will question its sustainability. Thus, a common refrain in regard to the Final Report (1998) by South Africa's Truth and Reconciliation Commission was "We've heard the truth. There is even talk about reconciliation. But where's the justice?"

The denial has thereby a direct negative impact on the development of a society, often by undermining its laws and the issue of justice, but also the level of democracy itself. If democracy is meant to be built on the rule of law and justice, upheld and safeguarded by state institutions, then surely the omission of legal consequences and justice would potentially undermine the democracy. What is more dangerous from a historical point of view is that such a default would imply the subsequent loss of the meaning of these events to future generations, a loss which is resembled to "losing a moral compass." The society becomes susceptible to similar wrongdoings in the absence of proper handling of preceding occasions. Nonetheless, denial, especially immediately after the committed wrongdoings, is rather the rule than the exception and naturally almost exclusively done by the perpetrator to escape responsibility. In some cases, e.g. the Armenian genocide, this denial is done explicitly, while in some other cases, e.g. in the case of the "Comfort women" and the role of the Japanese State, the denial is more implicit. The latter was evident in how an overwhelmingly majority of the surviving victims refused to accept a monetary compensation since the Japanese government still refused to admit its own responsibility (the monetary compensation was paid through a private fund rather than by the state, a decision perceived by the victims about state's refusal to assume any direct responsibility).

See also
 Outline of Genocide studies

References

Further reading

External links

 
Denialism
Genocide
Historical negationism
Historical revisionism